Daniel Lewis Lloyd (23 November 1843 – 4 August 1899) was a schoolteacher and cleric.

Born in Llanarth, Ceredigion, Wales, Lloyd was educated at Lampeter College School and Jesus College, Oxford. He was, successively, the headmaster at Dolgelley Grammar School (1867–1872), Friars School, Bangor (1872–1878) and Christ College, Brecon (1878–1890). He was then appointed Bishop of Bangor, (1890–1898), the first Welsh-speaking bishop there for over 200 years.

Lloyd died in Llanarth, Cardiganshire aged 55 and is buried in St David's churchyard, Llanarth. He had married Elizabeth Margaret Lewis, daughter of the Reverend D. Lewis of Trawsfynydd; they had three daughters. 

Bishop Lloyd also had two sons. D.R.L.Lloyd and Lt.Col H.C.L.Lloyd.

References

External links
 

1843 births
1899 deaths
Alumni of Jesus College, Oxford
Bishops of Bangor
19th-century Welsh Anglican bishops
Welsh-speaking clergy